The Campbell-Chrisp House is a historic house at 102 Elm Street in Bald Knob, Arkansas.  It is a -story structure, supposedly designed by Charles Thompson, in a Romanesque style with Colonial Revival details.  Prominent features include a large round-arch window on the first floor, above which is a three-part window with tall sections topped by round arches.  A porch supported by Ionic columns wraps around the front and side of the house.  The house was built in 1899 for Thomas Campbell, a local businessman.

The house was listed on National Register of Historic Places in 1991.

See also
National Register of Historic Places listings in White County, Arkansas

References

Houses on the National Register of Historic Places in Arkansas
Romanesque Revival architecture in Arkansas
Colonial Revival architecture in Arkansas
Houses completed in 1899
Houses in White County, Arkansas
National Register of Historic Places in White County, Arkansas
Buildings and structures in Bald Knob, Arkansas
1899 establishments in Arkansas